Volleyball Club Borac m:tel is men's volleyball club based in Banja Luka, Republika Srpska, Bosnia and Herzegovina . Club is currently competing in the Premier League.

Recent seasons

The recent season-by-season performance of the club:

References

External links
 Official website

Sport in Banja Luka
Volleyball clubs established in 2001
Borac